The Dominion Range is a broad mountain range, about  long, forming a prominent salient at the juncture of the Beardmore and Mill glaciers in Antarctica. The range is part of the Queen Maud Mountains

The range was discovered by the British Antarctic Expedition (1907–09) and named by Shackleton for the Dominion of New Zealand, which generously aided the expedition.

Key geological features

Mount Mills 
The mountain was discovered by the British Antarctic Expedition (1907–09) under Shackleton, and named for Sir James Mills who, with the government of New Zealand, paid the cost of towing the expedition ship Nimrod to Antarctica in 1908.

Mount Nimrod 
It was discovered by the British Antarctic Expedition (1907–09) and named after the expedition ship Nimrod.

Mount Saunders 
Discovered by the British Antarctic Expedition (1907–09) and named for Edward Saunders, secretary to Ernest Shackleton, who assisted in preparing the narrative of the expedition.

Safety Spur 
Safety Spur is a small rock spur from the Dominion Range, extending southeast from a broad isolated prominence between the mouth of Vandament Glacier and the west side of Mill Glacier. So named by the Southern Party of the New Zealand Geological Survey Antarctic Expedition (NZGSAE) (1961–62) because it was at this landfall that the party arrived after their first crossing of Mill Glacier in November 1961.

Features
Geographical features include:

 Ashworth Glacier
 Browns Butte
 Davis Nunataks
 Kane Rocks
 Koski Glacier
 Meyer Desert
 Mill Glacier
 Mount Cecily
 Mount Mills
 Plunket Point
 Rutkowski Glacier
 Scott Icefalls
 Vandament Glacier

See
Meyer Desert Formation biota

References

Queen Maud Mountains
Dufek Coast